Pavel Nevdakh (born 14 October 1976) is a Kazakh former cyclist. He won the Kazakhstan National Road Race Championships 2003 and the Time Trial Championships 2004.

Major results

1998
 3rd Time trial, Asian Games
 3rd National Time Trial Championships
1999
 3rd National Road Race Championships
 9th Asian Time Trial Championships
2001
 3rd National Time Trial Championships
2002
 2nd National Road Race Championships
 3rd National Time Trial Championships
 9th Overall Tour of Japan
2003
 1st  National Road Race Championships
 3rd Overall Tour of Romania
2004
 1st  National Time Trial Championships
 1st Stage 3 Tour de Serbie
 3rd Overall Tour d'Egypte
2006
 1st Overall Tour du Cameroun
1st Stage 2
 7th Overall Tour of Turkey
1st Prologue & Stage 5
 7th Overall Tour d'Egypte
2007
 1st Overall Kerman Tour
 1st Prologue Tour of Mevlana
 7th Overall Tour of Turkey
2008
 3rd Overall Tour d'Egypte
1st Prologue

References

1976 births
Living people
Kazakhstani male cyclists
Asian Games medalists in cycling
Medalists at the 1998 Asian Games
Asian Games bronze medalists for Kazakhstan
Cyclists at the 1998 Asian Games